Stefan Lazarević (1377 – 19 July 1427), also known as Stefan the Tall ( / Stefan Visoki), was the ruler of Serbia as prince (1389–1402) and despot (1402–1427). He was also a diplomat, legislator, ktetor, patron of the arts, poet and one of the founding members of the Order of the Dragon. The son of Prince Lazar Hrebeljanović, he was regarded as one of the finest knights and military leaders at that time. After the death of his father at Kosovo (1389), he became ruler of Moravian Serbia and ruled with his mother Milica (a Nemanjić), until he reached adulthood in 1393. Stefan led troops in several battles as an Ottoman vassal, until asserting independence after receiving the title of despot from the Byzantines in 1402.

Becoming a Hungarian ally in 1403–04, he received large possessions, including the important Belgrade and Golubac Fortress. He also held the superior rank in the chivalric Order of the Dragon. During his reign there was a long conflict with his nephew Đurađ Branković, which ended in 1412. Stefan also inherited Zeta, and waged war against Venice. Since he was childless, he designated his nephew Đurađ as heir in 1426, a year before his death.

On the domestic front, he broke the resistance of the Serbian nobles, and used the periods of peace to strengthen Serbia politically, economically, culturally and militarily. In 1412 he issued the Code of Mines, with a separate section on governing of Novo Brdo – the largest mine in the Balkans at that time. This code increased the development of mining in Serbia, which had been the main economic backbone of the Serbian Despotate. At the time of his death, Serbia was one of the largest silver producers in Europe. In the field of architecture, he continued development of the Morava school. His reign and personal literary works are sometimes associated with early signs of the Renaissance in the Serbian lands. He introduced knightly tournaments, modern battle tactics, and firearms to Serbia. He was a great patron of the arts and culture by providing shelter and support to scholars and refugees from neighboring countries that had been taken by the Ottomans. In addition, he was himself a writer, and his most important work is A Homage to Love, which is characterized by the Renaissance lines. During his reign the Resava School was formed.

Background and family
Stefan was the son of the prince of Moravian Serbia, Lazar, and his wife Milica, member of an elder, but collateral branch of Nemanjić dynasty. Milica's father Prince Vratko was a direct descendant of Vukan, the eldest son of Stefan Nemanja. In addition to Stefan, they had seven other children.

Marriage
On 12 September 1405, Stefan married Helena Gattilusio, the daughter of Francesco II of Lesbos. According to Konstantin the Philosopher, Stefan first saw his wife on Lesbos, where Francesco II offered him a choice among his daughters; the marriage was arranged "with the advice and participation" of Helena's sister, Empress Eirene. Surprisingly, there is no mention of Helena after her marriage to Stefan; this led Anthony Luttrell to remark that "apparently there were never any children; nothing is known of her death or burial; and, most unusual, she did not appear in any of the post-1402 fresco portraits of Stefan". Luttrell concludes "Maybe she was too young for the marriage to be consummated, and perhaps she stayed on Lesbos and never traveled to Serbia; possibly she died soon after her marriage."

Prince Stefan Lazarevic

Early years and rise to the throne

Stefan Lazarević was born, probably, in 1377 in Kruševac, the capital of his father, Prince Lazar. After the Battle of Kosovo on 15 June 1389, where his father was killed, Stefan became the new Serbian prince, but before he became of age the state was ruled by his mother, Princess Milica. In the battle of Kosovo in 1389, both rulers were killed, the Serbian Prince Lazar and Ottoman Sultan Murad I, which is very rare in history. (Murad I was the first and the last Ottoman ruler who was killed on the battlefield).

He came to the throne in a specific time for the state of Lazarević, who found herself surrounded by powerful neighbors. On one side was Bayezid I, who withdrew after the Battle of Kosovo in order to consolidate his power among the Ottomans, while next door there was Vuk Branković, the husband of Stefan's sister Mara, who after the battle became the most powerful of Serbian aristocrats. The neighbor on the west was Bosnian king Tvrtko I (1353–1377 ban, king 1377–1391) which was considered the legitimate successor of Nemanjić crown and he portrayed Battle of Kosovo like his own victory over the Ottomans, while their possessions in the north bordering with Hungary, King Sigismund.

On 7 July, three weeks after the battle, Sigismund sent his palatine Nicholas II Garay to negotiate with Vuk Branković about things that are in his and Serbian favor, where he confirmed in advance any agreements that they have achieved. Although both Nicholas and Vuk were married with sisters of Stefan, it was not uncommon at the time that strong neighbors, even relatives, to suppress the legitimate heirs to throne as juvenile. The outcome of these negotiations is not known, but already in the fall, Sigismund began an offensive against young Serbian prince Stefan. His forces have crossed the Sava River in October and early November were they occupied the fortresses of Borač and Čestin, near present day Kragujevac.

In these circumstances, the State Assembly with the support of Serbian Patriarch Spyridon (1379–1389), decided on the conclusion of peace and acceptance of the supremacy of the sultan Bayezid I, after which they began negotiations with the Ottomans, who ended by concluding peace, before the middle of year 1390. Details of making this decision are not closely familiar, but it is certain that peace was made before the death of Patriarch Spirydon, 18 August 1389.

According to the conclusion of peace, Prince Stefan pledged to send extra squads to Ottoman sultan and pay tribute, and he and his brother Vuk Lazarević must appear annually at the Sultan's Palace to confirm the allegiance to Bayezid I. In addition to these common vassal obligations, Bayezid I has married youngest daughter of Prince Lazar and Princess Milica, Olivera, which, her brother and the new prince, Stefan, personally had to take to the Sultan Bayezid in Bursa. The consequences of this peace were immediately visible because already in summer 1390, Serbian forces reinforced with extra Ottoman detachments, recaptured the lost cities, and probably in part of these operations the Ottomans took Golubac. Stefan militarily supported various Ottoman campaigns while Bayazid I in return supported Stefan against his nobles and his restoring of Serbia which would become a relatively strong state.

There is no data of the activities of Vuk Branković during this period. It is certain that after Battle of Kosovo he was sought to expand his area ( among other things, he has conquered the part of Polimlje ) and he used the same title that was used before him by Prince Lazar (lord of Serbs and Podunavije).
 
However, by early May 1390, he felt threatened and he asked the Republic of Ragusa to facilitate his safety, if it comes in a quandary, which could be linked with the Ottoman detachments who helped Stefan during the summer to suppress the Hungarians from their state. But there is no evidence that there was some hostility between Stefan and Vuk Branković. There was recorded in the sources that Vuk attended in formal transfer of Prince Lazar's holy body from his capital Priština to the monastery Ravanica late 1390 and early 1391, and is also known that in his court, during the year 1392, came Princess Milica.

The conflict in the Serbian-Hungarian border, has continued over the next two years, and in their suppression Sigismund was involved, who has repeatedly visited the army of the Danube. In Summer 1392, he was crossed the river near Kovin and march to the city of Ždrelo near Valjevo, then retreated and tried to win Golubac. At the same time, the area of Vuk Branković has been under Ottomans attack. In early 1392, they have occupied Skoplje and continued marching of the north, forcing Vuk by the end of the year to make peace with Bayezid and become his vassal.

Battles of Rovine and of Nicopolis

In 1393, Stefan became an adult and took over the throne, and his mother became a nun and withdrew to her endowment, monastery Ljubostinja. That same year, Bayezid I dealt with his Bulgarian vassals for their alleged links with the Hungarian King Sigismund. Veliko Tarnovo was besieged and Bulgaria devastated; Stefan's brother-in-law was Bulgarian ruler Ivan Shishman. After this, many Bulgarian scholars sought refuge in neighboring Christian countries, among which were Serbia.

At the end of 1393 and early 1394, Bayezid I began gathering his Christian vassals at Serres. Byzantine sources tell that among the vassals were Stefan, Emperor Manuel II (1391–1425), his nephew John VII (1390) and his brother Theodore I of Morea (r. 1383–1407), and the Serbian lord Constantine Dragaš. It is believed that Bayezid I planned to kill the vassals at the meeting and take their lands. He gave the order to kill them, but it was not done immediately, then he changed his mind, after which some of them went home, while the rest of them completed the conquest of Thessaly and Thessaloniki (12 April).

During the autumn of 1394, Bayezid started gathering forces for a campaign against the Wallachian voievode Mircea I (1386–1418). In this campaign, Stefan personally led the Serbian heavy cavalry, while Serbian nobles Marko (1371–1395), Constantine Dragaš and Konstantin Balšić led their forces. Bayezid's forces crossed the Danube and the battle of Rovine took place on 17 May 1395, near present-day Pitești, with a Wallachian victory. In the battle Marko and Dragaš were killed, and Bayezid annexed their lands. According to Constantine the Philosopher in his Life of Stefan Lazarević before the battle Marko said to Dragaš: "I pray God to help the Christians and that I will be among the first dead in this war."

The Ottoman forces then took over Vidin, and reinforced by Serbian detachments during the summer of 1396 marched into Banat, after attacking the lands of Vuk Branković and conquering a large part of it with Priština.

However, the victory at Rovine sparked a great crusade in which forces from England, France, Germany, and other European countries joined Hungarian king Sigismund and Mircea I with the Venetian fleet which was to enter the Danube from the Black Sea and support the army on the mainland. Crusader forces gathered in Hungary, after which they crossed the Danube and took Vidin. After that, the march continued down the Danube. Nicopolis, which had a large Ottoman garrison was besieged. The siege broke the blockade of Constantinople, forcing Bayezid to send troops towards the Danube, joining forces with Stefan Lazarević's heavy cavalary near Plovdiv. A great battle took place on 25 September 1396 in which the Crusader forces were completely destroyed. Although numerically superior, the Crusader army lacked a joint command and thus poorly coordinated on the battlefield. They also were both unfamiliar and ignorant of the Ottoman army's war methods. After initial Crusader success, the Ottomans went on a counterattack that stopped with the entry of Hungarian knights in battle, which began to suppress them. In this turning point of battle the Serbian heavy cavalry led by Stefan Lazarević himself broke through Hungarian lines and surrounded the King Sigmund, and attacking the Hungarian banner troops of Nicholas II Garay. Garay's troops were dispersed, which had a decisive influence on the course of the battle, because some of the Crusaders thought that Sigismund had died and that the battle was lost, while the Hungarian commanders convinced Sigismund that the battle was practically lost and that it was better to withdraw. After that Crusader orders fell apart and was followed by carnage. One of the participants in the battle, Johann Schiltberger, described the Serbian attack

According to some, Serbian forces were hidden in a grove on the left wing of Bayezid forces, making a sudden attack on the Hungarians probably from the side. A significant role was played by Stephen II Lackfi and Mircea I because they withdrew with their forces from the battlefield just before Stefan's attack, leaving Sigismund without support. They had probably dealt with Stefan before the battle. Sigismund I managed to escape by fisherman's boat to the Venetian ships in the Danube. It is possible that Stefan left enough time for him to board the boat; Stefan saving Sigismund may be one of the causes of Stefan's later induction into the Order of the Dragon (as the first and foremost)

There were disastrous consequences for the Balkan Christians after the defeat at the Battle of Nicopolis. Vidin was destroyed, Athens occupied (1397), the Despotate of Morea devastated once again, the fall of Constantinople became practically inevitable, and the area of Vuk Branković was taken by the Ottomans. Vuk Branković was captured and soon died in captivity (1397). Most of his area was transferred to the control of Stefan Lazarević, a small portion (centered in Vučitrn) was left to his wife Maria and sons (Đurađ, Grgur and Lazar), while the Ottomans retained strategic locations under their direct rule. In addition, the Ottoman forces marched into Hungary and plundered its southern parts, in particular, Zemun (which was devastated) and Sremska Mitrovica (which was burned down, and its population displaced).

Ottoman invasion of Bosnia and nobles rebellion
The Ottomans continued the offensive in the Balkans in January 1398 and attack Bosnia. The leader of the action was one of the Bayezid's son, Musa Çelebi, and Prince Stefan joined them with Serbian extra squads. This campaign, besides looting Bosnia, did not achieve any success, and the biggest culprit, according to Stefan's biographer, was a very bad winter, and some of the soldiers and prisoners returned to their lands.

Some of the nobility tried to take advantage of Stevan's campaign to oust him from throne. Their leaders, Dukes Novak Belocrkvić and Nikola Zojić with help of Voivode Mihajlo, tried to show the failure of invasion of Bosnia to Bayezid I, as a result of Stefan's connection with the Hungarian King Sigismund and with recognition directly Bayezid I supreme power gain independence in lands of Prince Stefan. The exact course of further events is not precisely known, but it is evident that Stephen knew of the plot, having known of it via Mihajlo. He invited to his castle Duke Novak, who had estates in Toplica (probably the lands around Kuršumlija) and in the Hvosno (Crkolez village near Peć) and killed him. After that Belocrkvić, who had estates around the Rudnik, and his family (wife and four daughters) fled to the established Ostrvica and became a monk, for which he lost his possessions in Serbia, but he saved his life.

It is certain also that their allegations came to Bayezid and in the second half of March, the Ottoman forces marched into Serbia. It is not known what they did in Serbia; there was no documented campaign on any of the neighboring countries. During the spring, Stefan's mother, a nun Eugene with monk Jefimija went to Bayezid, to smooth the relations between them. They have returned to Serbia prior to 23 May and managed to ensure that Stefan is received by Bayezid and justify himself before the sultan. In addition, they are brought from Bursa and the relics of St. Petka, which are most likely located in the castle church in Kruševac, Lazarica.

Bayezid is reported to have held Prince Stefan in high esteem, bestowing upon him a respect which he did not always accord his other Christian vassals, or even his own sons. Later, Bayezid marries Stefan's sister. When, some of Stefan's nobles complain to Bayezid that he is doing a deal with the Hungarians against the Turks, Stefan first allows his mother to travel to Edirne and plead his case with the sultan, and then actually goes himself. Both mother and son are received generously by Bayezid, and the embarrassing situation is resolved:

Battle of Ankara

The relationship between Prince Stefan and Branković family over the years is not known from historical sources. It is known that they were able, with the most money that Vuk Branković is left on the guarding in the Kotor and Republic of Ragusa, to recover some of the former countries. In early 1402, their area included parts of Kosovo, Polimlje, Sjenica and Brskovo, and since the spring of that year they became Bayezid's vassals, with the same responsibilities Prince Stefan had. Beyond their control remained Zvečan, Jeleč and Gluhavica, which were held by the Ottomans, and Priština, which we know that in March the same year, was part of the state of Stefan Lazarević.

Great changes of events in Asia Minor and Southeastern Europe were caused by an invasion of the Tatars under the leadership of Tamerlane, one of the great conquerors in world history. His invasion into Asia Minor forced Bayezid I to gather his forces and try to confront him in battle, which took place 28 July 1402, near from Angora (Ankara, the capital of Turkey).

In this battle Ottoman forces suffered defeat, Bayezid I and one of his sons, Musa Çelebi, were captured and the following year Bayezid died in captivity. One of the main reasons for the Ottoman defeat was due to the desertion of Turkic and Tartar cavalry from Anatolia, which prior to the beginning of the battle defected to Timur's side, unhappy with Bayezid's rule and due to a sense of camaraderie with the forces of Timur. This allowed the Timur's forces to break Bayezid's left wing and encircle his center, where was located the Sultan with his janissaries (around 10,000). On the right wing, there were Bayezid's vassals, among whom were Đurađ Branković and his brother Grgur, Stefan's brother Vuk, and Stefan himself, who was also a commander of the right wing. He fought bravely, which caused admiration from Timur. Prince Stefan and his knights, which according to chronicler Duka and several contemporaries, were 5000 heavily armed men with spears, including cavalry, repeatedly attacked the enemy lines in order to rescue his master Bayezid I from hostile environments. He eventually succeeded in it, but Bayezid refused to withdraw, after which Stefan took with him his son Süleyman Çelebi and started to retreat towards Bursa under constant attacks of the hordes of Tatars. Byzantine chronicler Laonikos Chalkokondyles states that "the Serbs fought as real heroes, each worthy of praise", adding that "They attacked Tatars with great vigor, crushing them hard in the fight", and about Serbian struggle there is evidenced toponym Srb-ghazi - Serbian winner, near Ankara.

Sultan Bayezid I had probably reconciled with his destiny. During the fight, Prince Stefan was wounded, while Gregory Branković was captured and later released. In the meantime, Bayezid was captured with his soldiers, his son Musa and his harem, where the Stefan's sister Olivera was.

One of the reasons Stefan honored his vassal obligations to Bayezid was the desire to keep the Serbian-Ottoman Alliance strong under looming Hungarian pressure. Another was that Stefan's sister Olivera that was married to the Sultan. She was captured in the battle and later released, through an agreement that was signed between Stefan and Timur. It seems that a ransom wasn't paid, thanks to the great respect that Timur had for Olivera's brother Stefan, and she returned to Serbia (Spring 1403), and a little later she settled permanently in Stefan's castle, in Belgrade. It is interesting to note that a group of imprisoned Serbs were taken to Samarkand where they were employed on construction works. On the other hand, Timur's forces had already left Asia Minor in 1403, and Timur himself died in early 1405, during his expedition to China. In the Ottoman Empire, Bayezid's capture, and then his death, brought on a civil war between his sons for throne.

Stay at Constantinople

From Bursa Stefan and his brother Vuk Lazarević came to Constantinople, which was released after several years of Ottoman blockade. John VII Palaiologos (who ruled in place of his absent uncle Emperor Manuel II Palaiologos) awarded Prince Stefan in August 1402 the high Byzantine title of Despot, which in Byzantine hierarchy was just beneath the Imperial. In addition, the marriage of Stefan and Helen Gattilusio, the daughter of Florentine master of Lesbos Francesco II Gattilusio was contracted. These events are evidence of Stefan's new commitment as vassal to King Sigismund.

When the Lazarević brothers were in Constantinople, they entered an open conflict with the Branković family. Đurađ Branković was imprisoned at the city dungeon on his return to Constantinople, on Stefan's command. The reason for this is unknown, and many later chroniclers, such as Mavro Orbini, claim that Đurađ was planning to join Bayezid I's son Süleyman, who established his power in the European part of the Ottoman Empire. This is probably true, as Đurađ after escaping from prison in September, went to Süleyman and asked him for military aid against Lazarević.

Stefan's return to Serbia was thwarted due to Ottoman hostility; returning Serbian troops were killed on their way home near Adrianople. The two brothers and about 260 remaining soldiers embarked to Serbia, with a shorter stay in Lesbos. Their first stop was Zeta, ruled by Đurađ II Balšić, the husband of Stefan's sister Jelena. Đurađ II received them at his capital in Ulcinj, after which Stefan began organizing the army for a confrontation with Branković. Stefan's mother gathered an army in Serbia, while at the same time Branković and Ottoman troops took control of roads in Kosovo to prevent the return of Stefan.

Ottoman Interregnum

Battle of Tripolje

In late October, Stefan's army from Bar, moved across the country of Balšić and Venetian lands, from Shkoder to Kosovo. Avoiding the main roads controlled by his opponents, Stefan's forces arrived at Gračanica 21 November near Tripolje, in the following battle the forces of Branković, strengthened by Ottoman detachments, were defeated.

Stephen broke his army in two, with orders sent by his mother, before the battle, and his opponents did the same. Most of the troops were placed under the command of his brother Vuk and directed them against the forces commanded by Đurađ Branković, while he, with a smaller part of the army attacked the Ottomans. Forces under his command had won a victory, but the significance it played was small Caesar Uglješa Vlatković. He was still an Ottoman vassal, but he reported to Stefan with their war plan, and during the battle was joined at his side. As a reward for this, Stefan gave him authority over Vranje, Inogoštem (Surdulica) and Preševo, which had previously belonged to his father and that area was connected to the Serbian despotate. Lazarević, having retreated after the battle in Novo Brdo, came into a verbal conflict with Vuk. The despot's younger brother accused him of ignorance of war casualties and his weak leadership skills, because the bulk of their forces, commanded by Vuk, were defeated in the battle with the army led by Đurađ Branković.

Victory in Battle of Tripolje, enabled Stefan to regain his throne and influence in Serbia, which was further strengthened in the coming years. However, the fight with Branković had not ended and in a sense, further complicated by the conflict that arose between Stefan and Vuk. His younger brother in the summer 1403 left Serbia and headed to Süleyman, to ask him for help and force his older brother to cede part of the state administration. He was in fact told to stop by their mother, who followed him, but she failed to reach him before he arrived at the court of Süleyman. During his time at his court, she was able to reconcile the brothers prior to October 1404 and she succeeded in smoothing relations between Stefan and Süleyman. During the next year, Stefan tried to avoid the renewal of hostilities with the Ottomans.

In 1403, Süleyman was in Gallipoli negotiating with a number of Christian states (Byzantium, Genoa, Venice, Knights Hospitaller and Naxos) in the Balkans in order to secure an agreement with them and start an offensive against his brothers in Asia Minor. The terms of the agreement were that Byzantium was to cease being a vassal of the Ottoman, while in the territorial sense, regain Thessaloniki and a number of cities on the coast of the Bosphorus and Black Sea. One of the provisions of this contract referred to Stefan, although he probably did not take part in its conclusion. Stefan kept his former possessions, but had to still pay tribute and send the Sultan support militarily, although he was not obliged to lead them himself.

The Kingdom of Hungary at that time was in a crisis, King Sigmund I had lost the throne because part of the nobility was captured April 1401 in Buda. He was released in late 1401 and retired to Bohemia, where he spent the next year.

Order of the Dragon

Changed conditions in Southeast Europe in the early fifteenth century, led to a convergence of Despot Stefan and Hungarian king Sigismund. Stefan needed a strong ally who could help him get rid of Ottoman domination, but also stay on the throne of Serbia, due to an open conflict with Branković, who enjoyed the support of Süleyman. On the other hand, Hungary was in a deep internal crisis, and, until 1403, Sigismund was unable to return to the country and regain control, although the resistance of his opponent failed to break even after his return. It was therefore necessary for him to rely on a secure southern border, which had previously been constantly exposed to the combined Serbian-Ottoman attacks, while simultaneously trying to provide a strong base for the fight against the Ottomans and eventually expand to the south.

The negotiations were most likely initiated by King Sigismund, and he sent emissaries to Stefan, among whom was his close associate of Florentine origin, Filippo Scolari. The objective of this delegation had been successful, and led to the conclusion of an agreement between the two rulers in late 1403 or early 1404. Under its provisions, Stefan accepted vassal relations to Sigismund, and received from him Mačva and Belgrade. With these new lands, including the Golubac Fortress, Stefan had strengthened his northern border, now delineated by the Sava and Danube rivers. As now a close ally to Sigismund, Stefan was among the first knights of the Order of the Dragon.

Settling the situation in Serbia and clashes in Zeta
At the same time (1403 or early in 1404) Stefan attacked lands of Branković around river Sitnica, and then began to attack the areas under Ottoman control, in which it might have had and Hungarian military support troops. It is not known exactly from which cities and regions has managed to push the Ottomans, but it is thought that his offensive was directed toward eastern Serbia, and Kosovo. After these successes, he was able to make peace with Branković, and at the same time through his mother reconciled with Süleyman.

Immediately after the takeover of Belgrade, Stefan started the reconstruction of its fortifications, which were destroyed by the Ottomans in 1397. In addition, he began work on the development of the city, which were carried out by the end of his reign, but in the beginning of 1405, Stefan was transferred his capital to it, which until then was in Kruševac. In September of the same year, he married Helena Gattilusio, but only two months later, with his mother's death (11 November), Stefan remained without strong support. Nevertheless, the situation in Serbia have stabilized and start to grow in prosperity, as evidenced by the charter in Borač, 2 December of that year, issued from Dubrovnik. Negotiations about their shopping preferences are driven during the year and Despot with present Charter confirmed the privileges that they previously enjoyed. It also represents the charter of Serbian ruler, which was issued after the 1387th in Dubrovnik. At the end of the month, a charter was issued to them from Stefan's sister Mara Branković with sons. This includes Dubrovnik provide benefits to its merchants throughout Serbia, but it is noticeable that Stefan was not referred to the charter, even though her husband Vuk in their charters, always calling on those issued by Lazar of Prince Lazar.

At the beginning of 1405 The great rebellion broke out in the local population in Skadar end against the Venetian rule. The reason for it lay in the arrogant and high-handed fashion of Venetian rule, which was manifested impounding the property, which were then shared to Venetian supporters, denying the rights of Orthodox churches in the area under the supreme authority of Venice and a host of other abuses of power. In this opposition became involved Stefan's nephew Balša III (1403-1421) which sought to restore the cities which his father, Đurađ Stracimirović Balšić, once transferred to Venice (1396), to protect from the Ottoman invasion. He asked for help from Süleyman in fighting, and from Duke Vuk Lazarević, but is nevertheless a war waged without major battles and a clear winner. In the negotiations on concluding a peace as a mediator intervened and Despot Stefan himself, but they were unsuccessful, although guided by a number of occasions. He was first in May 1406 mediated by the Venetians, then in June 1407 when he was with his sister Mara and Nikita Topi supposed to guarantee that the Balša III fulfill the obligations, but peace was not concluded. A peace agreement was finally signed in June 1408th The and in it Stefan was mentioned as one of the guarantors of the signed contract, but it did not come into effect and the conflict continued.

In December 1408, Hungarian King Sigismund founded the Order of the Dragon, gathering his supporters. The symbol of the order was a dragon, and the first among the knights was Stefan Lazarević, the founding charter of 13 December 1408. He was present at the ceremony in honor of knights, which was held in Buda, and the dragon symbol was present at his court.

The rebellion of brother Vuk
At that time, the late 1408, Stefan protested against his younger brother Vuk. The reason for his dissatisfaction was that Stefan did not want to share throne with him and give him part of the state administration. In turn, Vuk was probably disappointed to Stefan's connecting with Sigmund I and the West. He therefore went to Süleyman and asked him for military assistance against Stefan. In return, he promised to recognize his sovereignty, if he receives his own state and if Branković and his brothers joined him.

At the beginning of 1409, Süleyman's Ottoman forces broke into Serbia at the battlefield of Kosovo and nearby Priština was destroyed, as evidenced by a letter that arrived in February in Dubrovnik, from the merchants of the city. Dubrovnik people in Serbia were also instructed that, as citizens of the Republic, could call for its neutrality during the conflict, but they were also told not to harm Stefan's people, as well as in the case of attacks on towns where they were engaged in their defense. Stefan was assisted in the fighting by Sigismund I, whose forces were under the command of Philip de Skolarisa, late January through Kovin, joined to Serbia. His quick reaction testifies to the fact that Stefan and Sigismund were aware of Vuk's impending departure to Süleyman's side Ottoman attack. In early May, Sigismund went to Serbia, who was joined by Ban Jovan Morović from Mačva, but in June began Süleyman's new offensive. After fierce battles that were fought during the summer, Stefan withdrew and enclosed himself in Belgrade. He refused to conform with Süleyman, but was forced to negotiate with his brother, which practically led to the division of the country. Vuk was submitted to the administration of its southern part, which included the area south of the West Morava. He ruled on his own and accepted Süleyman suzerainty, as did the Branković family.

In addition to the conflict in Serbia, the year 1409 had several significant events that influenced the change of situation in the Balkans. Süleymanmade peace with the Venetians in June, to whom they pledged to pay an annual tribute, as well as surrendering their former possessions in the area of Skadar and Zeta. His brother and rival in the struggle for power, Musa Çelebi moved to Europe and began to gather around him supporters and allies in the fight against Süleyman.

Civil war between Musa and Süleyman

Stefan and Musa Çelebi, as a result of conflict with Süleyman, were natural allies. Through his member, Duke Vitko, Stefan first checked Musa's force and then began negotiations that led to the conclusion of the alliance. In addition to Stefan,the Branković family, and Vuk Lazarević also had joined Musa. His forces began an offensive while Süleyman was in Asia Minor. At the beginning of 1410, Gallipoli was occupied, and by 13 February, were at Süleyman's Yambol, defeating defending beglerbeg Sinan, which has forced his brother to try to return to Europe and deal with Musa.

That gave him the support of the Byzantine emperor Manuel II Palaiologos, with whom he remained on friendly terms and who gave him a boat to cross the Bosporus. Manuel's position significantly influenced the distribution of forces on the ground and very quickly changed those who supported Musa approach to Süleyman. Help in the transfer of his forces in Europe, tried to give prince Vuk, who asked the Venetian deputies in early June to obtain the Venetian fleet's assistance in the transport of troops. Vuk very soon after that escaped to Süleyman, as did the Branković brothers.

Stefan and Musa tried to prevent the crossing of Süleyman's forces in Europe, with an attack on the fleet that was carrying them. There in Galatians, they managed to destroy some of the ships, but Süleyman's forces still managed to cross the Bosporus Strait.

The great battle between the two Bayezid sons occurred on 15. June in Battle of Kosmidion, on the banks of the Golden Horn, in front of the Byzantine land walls of Constantinople. Musa's forces were defeated, and when he left the battlefield, the Despot Stefan pulled back from the battle. He began his departure following the Golden Horn to the Galatians, but the Byzantine emperor Manuel sent ships to pick him up and carried him to Constantinople, although he himself was on the side of Süleyman. Constantinople organized a solemn reception for Stefan, and Manuel used the situation to confirm his title of Despot, and then handed over the crown of despotic dignity. After a short stay in the Byzantine capital, to Stefan and his entourage, including Uglješa Vlatković, with ships headed to Serbia. Through the Black Sea and Danube rivers, and the state of Duke Mirča, they arrived in Golubac in late July or early August of that year.

Süleyman after winning the Battle of Kosmidion again tried to push Stefan Lazarević from the throne, as he did after the Battle of Angora 1402; sending Stefan's relatives to Serbia to take the throne. In late June, he sent Vuk Lazarević and Lazar Branković to Serbia, who the continued the fight with his younger brother, whom he once again defeated on 11 July in Adrianople.

However, he failed in Serbia. During that time, on 4 July the supporters of Musa caught the Serbian Prince in Filipolje. Vuk Lazarević, after the deliberation of his fate was executed, Lazar Branković was still left in life for a few days. Musa attempted to blackmail Đurađ Branković to move to his side for the upcoming battle (of Adrianople, 11 July). He refused, and actively participated in the victory of Süleyman, so Musa had Lazar executed. Soon after that, Stefan returned to the country and took control of it in its entirety, including the southern parts that were ruled by his brother, Prince Vuk.

Musa's position after the defea was severely affected and he retired to Stefan, Serbia. He managed to gain the support of the Ottomans in Europe, and other followers of Süleyman approached him, some because of his promise, and some because Süleyman's unbalanced posture. His troops at the beginning of 1411 defeated Süleyman's defending troops in Serdica, while Süleyman himself escaped from Adrianople and tried to get to Constantinople. On this journey, he was captured and killed (17 February) by Musa's supporters, who then became the sole ruler of the European part of Ottoman Empire.

Reconciliation with Đurađ Branković
His rise to throne has not brought peace and stability to Balkans, on the contrary, he quickly turned against themselves and their former allies. Serbian Parliament, were sent by Stefan to regulate relations and confirming previous agreements, but not only that he failed, but he barely managed to save their own lives, but Musa was given permission to dig up Vuk Lazarević and his remains transferred to Serbia. This was a clear declaration of war and Stefan immediately began offensive. He entered the Pirot area from which they launched attacks on the Ottomans, who had stopped only when he sent a mission of Musa and offered talks.

Cooperation between Sigismund I and Stefan continued through 1411, when the Serbian Despot, in July, stayed in Buda, accompanied by his nobles. On that occasion there was a strengthening of mutual relations, but the text of the agreement and its provisions have not been preserved. His biographer says that on that occasion Stefan did true love with West, and Jovana Kalić said that Stefan since then often went to Buda and not be returned without a new property, which he lavishly endowed the ruler of Hungary, adding that from Hungarian sources that time proclaim that the Serbian Despot with their country subverted the supremacy of the Hungarian king. Stefan received form Sigismund lands in former Hungary, which included the villages, towns and mines, which were in Szatmár County, Bihar County, Szabolcs County and Torontál County. By late summer, Sigismund I made peace with the King of Bosnia Ostoja (the first government of 1398-1404, the second government from 1409 to 1418) and other nobles from Bosnia, which ended the long-term conflicts. Under his control remained Usora area, while Srebrnica, probably during that year, transferred to Despot Stefan. At the end of the year, Stefan's sister and the widow of Đurađ II Kotromanić Balšić, Jelena remarried to Sandalj Hranić Kosača after his peace with Sigismund I. In May next year, Stefan was with a large entourage was back in Buda. He attended the great council of the European aristocracy in which there has been a reconciliation between Sigismund I and Polish king Vladislav II (Duke of Lithuania 1377-1434, king of Poland from 1386 to 1434), and next to him at the council appeared nobles and the king of Bosnia, as well as a number of other Balkan rulers and nobles.

At the same time, Stefan's sister, Mara, linked up with him and on behalf of his son Đurađ, who led his forces in army of Musa, tried to fix the relations between them and reconcile them, in which she succeeded. Musa forces in the fall 1411, attacked the town of Selimvria on the Sea of Marmara near Constantinople, in which it had been the son of Süleyman, Orhan, whom was the candidate of Byzantine emperor Manuel II Palaiologos for the Ottoman throne. During the siege, Musa tried to kill Đurađ, but he managed to save himself by escaping to the town of Selimvria, with his troops. Then, from Thessaloniki, he back in the fall 1412 in Serbia and reconciled with his uncle Stefan, which ended the conflict between two families that has caused division in Serbia.

War against Musa and end the civil war

Against Musa was created a broad coalition, in which the Ottoman commanders from some parts of the Balkans, and his only remaining brother, Mehmed I, who ruled part of former Bayezid Asian countries, joined them. His first attempt to cross into Europe 1411 was finished with defeat, but they kept fighting on other fronts, so that by the end of that year Stefan, and Skopje and Kyustendil Beylerbey's attacked the country of Musa. Winter weather and swollen river Marica have prevented the connection of their and Mehmed I's forces over the Ser area. The answer to this attack came in the early 1412 when Musa from around Serdica and Čemernik fell over in Vranje area and looted it, while Uglješa Vlatković, who ruled that part of Serbian Despotate, barely saved himself. His forces then continued with march to Novo Brdo, but the news of the arrival of Despot Stefan-led, he left Serbia and went to Thessaloniki and Thessaly.

New campaign Musa began in 1413, with attack on Hamza bey who held the Svrljig and Soko Grad. He was captured and executed, and Musa forces then occupied Bovan and Lipovac, as well as many other towns in Morava Valley (Koprijan, Kruševac, Markovo Kale, Petrus and Stalać, whose commander was killed heroically providing great resistance. In addition, his troops, according to reports in March that were sent from Novo Brdo to Dubrovnik, devastated Toplica and Braničevo.

During this period, Despot Stefan was collecting his forces, and military support he received from Sigismund, but also of his son in law Sandalj Hranić Kosača. His forces were met with Mehmed I commanders near Kruševac and after the agreement there was a merger of their armies, which were sent to the south. At the mouth of the Toplica river at Dobrič, near Koprijan, they were joined by some Musa supporters, including the commander of the army Evrenos, after which they continued traveling to Ovče Polje. Stefan, Sandalj Hranić Kosača and Jovan Morović at Skopska Crna Gora leave troops and return to Serbia, and command of them took Đurađ Branković.

So the battle has come on 15 July 1413, near the village Camurlu (Battle of Camurlu), at the mountain Vitosha, in present-day Bulgaria. Musa forces managed to suppress the Serbian army at the first phase of fighting, but Đurađ attacked from the side, which is especially noted the great leader Radič Postupović, and managed to break enemy lines and brought the victory of the allied troops. During the withdrawal from the battle, Musa was on the river Iskra captured and killed, which after more than a decade ended the civil war in the Ottoman Empire. Stefan and Đurađ after the battle acknowledged supremacy of Mehmed I, who gave to Stefan rich gifts and some areas, including the fortress Znepolje and the area Koprijan.

Period of peace

End of civil war between the sons of Bayezid I, is the beginning of many years of peace in Serbia, which enabled its further economic and cultural development. Stefan has not intervened militarily in conflicts in the coastal area, as well as in the wars that have swept Bosnia 1413th and brought the Ottomans into it. Sigismund's 1415th was launched a two counter-offensive in Bosnia while first, earlier this year failed to oust the Ottomans, the second, mid-year, ended as a complete disaster. Hungarian forces in July were broken at Lašva, and much of the nobility was captured and taken to Zvečan. They later managed to free themselves through negotiation and purchase, in which Stefan participated himself, who brokered the release of Jovan Morović.

The situation in Bosnia was further complicated by the murder of Prince Pavle Radenović in late August 1415, behind which stood was king Ostoja and Sandalj Hranić Kosača, which led to clashes between Pavlović and Kosača. In addition, the Ottoman presence and the failures of the Hungarian army, led the nobility in Bosnia to turn against Sigismund, and one consequence was the decision of Bosnian Parliament to take Srebrenica from Stefan, but because of the situation that was not possible implemented.

At this time there was a great ecclesiastical council in Constance on Lake Constance, which lasted from 1414 till 1418 years and gathered a great number of ecclesiastical and secular nobility from Catholic countries. Parliament dealt with the so-called Western Schism, and the fate of Jan Hus that was eventually put to death (6 July 1415), which led to Hussite Wars. In addition, it is pointed out and the threat of the Ottomans, among the participants of Parliament, was also a mission of the Serbian Despot, and it is not impossible that he went there.

Despot himself in that period, even though he was a vassal of the Ottoman sultans, is not giving up on efforts to rid the Ottoman domination, as evidenced by the letters he wrote to his subordinates in Hungary and the Byzantine and deputies in the Republic of Venice, that in the case of the creation of a wider anti-Ottoman coalition it joined Serbia. The period of peace, Stefan used to finish his monumental endowment Resava, with today's Despotovac. Its construction began in 1407 but was repeatedly interrupted by outbursts of the Ottoman Empire (1409, 1411-1413), that were finished in 1418.

Stefan was a great patron of art and culture providing support and shelter to scholars from Serbia and exiles from surrounding countries occupied by the Ottomans. He was educated at his parents' home, he spoke and wrote Serbo-Slavic; he could speak Greek and was familiar with Latin. Under his rule, he issued Code of Mines in 1412 in Novo Brdo, the economic center of Serbia.

He was an author, and his main works include Slovo ljubve (A Homage to Love) that he dedicated to his brother Vuk, and Natpis na mramornom stubu na Kosovo (Inscription on the Marble Pillar at Kosovo).

Some works he wrote during his reign have been preserved. During his reign, rich transcribing activity – The Transcription School of Resava – was developed in his foundation, the Manasija Monastery. More Christian works and capital works of an ancient civilization were transcribed there than in all times preceding the Despot's ruling.

During the short time the life of the founder and monastery coincided (1407–27), so much was achieved in Resava that it remained an important and outstanding monument in the history of Serbian and Slavic culture in general. It was there that Bulgarian-born Constantine the Philosopher, a reputable "Serbian teacher", translator and historian established the famous orthographic school of Resava to correct errors in the ecclesiastical literature incurred by numerous translations and incorrect transcriptions, and to thoroughly change the previous orthography.

Constantine's essay on how Slavic books should be written recommended a very complicated orthography that subsequently many authors adopted and used for a long time. Regardless of subsequent criticism of this endeavour, the very fact that in Serbia in the 15th century an essay was written on orthography and its rules is very important. Until the very end of the 17th century documents confirm the outstanding reputation of translations and transcripts originating from the Resava School.

Death

As most of the rulers and noblemen of those times, Despot Stefan loved and used to saddle his horse often and ride with his escort to hunt in nearby villages. On one of the returns from the castle in Belgrade Fortress finding himself near the place known as Glava, or Glavica, at Mt. Kosmaj, Despot stopped his escort in order to ride out to hunt. As accustomed he stretched his hand forward to let the hawk on it but his body did not obey. The whole escort noticed the way his body was leaning from one to the other side, becoming aware that something unusual was happening. Everybody knew well his imposing pose on a horse and they all doubtfully watched him fall down to ground helplessly. According to Constantine the Philosopher, his sudden death on 19 July 1427 was indicated by a mystic storm which made the sky from Belgrade turn black, and the thunder covered his soft, last words, "Get George, get George!"

The death of Despot was experienced as the Last Judgement, a disaster, as the Judgement day among people. Dreading future troubles, the whole state grieved for their ruler, whom they knew from the beginning was "the chosen messenger of the new age". Despot's death announced the hardest period in the history of the Serbian state and people represented in destruction of the state Despot and loss of state identity. The old Byzantine-South Slavonic prophecies (the Revelation of Pseudo-Methodius, the apocryphal Visions of Daniel and the Oracles of Leo the Wise) usually interpreted Ishmaelite, that is Muslims, conquests as a result of Christian sins. For the Orthodox Christians, in the 15th century, this topos became especially alluring, since it corresponded to the idea of "the end of the world" in the year 7000 "from the creation of the world" (=1491/1492 AD), according to the Byzantine calendar.

In order to save the memory of the moment of deceasing of the favourite and honoured ruler, a stone marker was erected on the place where Despot fell off the horse. Saying farewell to their master, his closest associates, who were escorting him in the moment of the accident, built a monument of marble stone, leaving messages of loyalty and respect. These inscriptions show the monument was built by Đurađ Zubrović, a nobleman from the territory, which the hamlet Glava belonged to, as well as the knight from Despot's escort. Despots Stephanos was buried at Resava.

Many researchers believe that the cause of death of the despot Stefan was a stroke or a heart attack, while there are those who doubt this version, looking for the cause in a conspiracy using the statements of his biographer Constantine the Philosopher "When he was in a place called Glavica, having lunch he went out to hunt, and while he was still hunting..." These researchers suspect that the despot Stefan was poisoned. He probably became more pro-Western than he should have been. Since from the Serbian perspective there was a difference between the Eastern and Western world. And Serbia is situated between East and West in an imagined world.

Literary works
Apart from the biographical notes in charters and especially in the Code on The Mine Novo Brdo (1412), Stefan Lazarević wrote three literary works:

 The Grave Sobbing for prince Lazar (1389)
 The Inscription on the Kosovo Marble Column (1404)
 A Homage to Love (1409), a poetic epistle to his brother Vuk
 Law on Mines
 Translation of a Greek work titled "On Times Future"

He was probably the patron of the most extensively illuminated Serbian manuscript, the Serbian Psalter, which is now kept in the Bavarian State Library in Munich.

Titles
"Lord(Gospodar) of all the Serbs and Podunavlje", inherited through his father.

An inscription names him Despot, Lord "of all Serbs and Podunavlje and Posavje and part of Hungarian lands and Bosnian [lands], and also Maritime Zeta".
"Despot of the Kingdom of Rascia and Lord of Serbia". After 1402.
"Despot, Lord of Rascia", in the founding charter of the Order of the Dragon (1408). He was the first on the list.
"Despot, Lord of all Serbs and the Maritime".

In popular culture
In 2017, Aleksandar Tešić wrote an epic novel Cosingas about the war adventures of despot Stefan.

Serbian power metal band Despot made a song inspired by the life of Stefan Lazarević titled Despot's fate.

See also
 Đurađ Branković (despot 1427–1456)
 Mahmud Pasha Angelović (grand vizier 1453–1468; 1472–1473)
 Despotate of Serbia
 Despotate of Morea
 Ottoman Empire
 Second Scutari War

References

Sources
 Effects of early Ottoman conquests on the State and Social Structure of the Lazarević Principality
 Princess Milica as the Ottoman vassal - One Case of Multifaceted Serbian-Ottoman Relations at the end of 14th Century, Uluslararsa Balkan Tarihi Ve Kültürü Sempozyumu, vol l. 1, Çanakkale 2017, 88-102.
 The Ottoman-Serbian Attack on Bosnia in 1398

Further reading

Books
Life of Despot Stefan Lazarević by Constantine the Philosopher (ca. 1431).

Journals

Symposia

External links
 Manasija
 What was the decisive moment at the battle of Nicopolis (Armchair General, Joshua Gilbert, 08.08.2008)
 Astronomical motifs in Serbian medieval numismatics (Coins of Despot Stefan Lazarević)

|-

|-

1370s births
1427 deaths
14th-century Serbian monarchs
15th-century Serbian monarchs
Despots of Serbia
Stefan
Christians of the Battle of Nicopolis
Order of the Dragon
People from Kruševac
Serbian male poets
Serbian saints of the Eastern Orthodox Church
14th-century Serbian writers
15th-century Serbian writers
Christian writers
Eastern Orthodox monarchs
Burials at Serbian Orthodox monasteries and churches
Eastern Orthodox royal saints
Hungarian knights
15th-century Hungarian nobility